Sky garden may refer to:

 20 Fenchurch Street sky garden, an indoor garden atop a skyscraper in the City of London financial district
 Meguro Sky Garden, a roof garden park in Tokyo
 Seoul Skygarden, an elevated, linear park in Seoul
 Sky Gardens, a tower in Dubai
 Sky Gardens Nine Elms, a residential building in Central London
 Water Sky Garden, a sculptural environment designed by Janet Echelman for the 2010 Vancouver Olympics
 Sky Garden, Szczecin, a building in Szczecin
 Kai Tak Sky Garden, an elevated garden that is part of the Kai Tak Development

See also 
 Roof garden, a garden on the roof of a building